Emamabad (also Romanized as Emāmābād) is a village in Cheghapur Rural District, Kaki District, Dashti County, Bushehr Province, Iran. At the 2006 census, its population was 214, in 40 families.

References 

Populated places in Dashti County